Chasin' the Gypsy is the sixth album by saxophonist James Carter which was released on the Atlantic label in 2000.

Reception

The AllMusic review by Richard S. Ginell says, " Chasin' the Gypsy, as you might guess, is an homage to Django Reinhardt, whose music Carter used to dig on Detroit radio when he was a teenager, but Carter doesn't take the predictable reverent path in paying his respects ... this is a delightful departure for Carter, though probably destined to be a one-off excursion". In JazzTimes Bill Milkowski wrote, "Just when you had him pegged as a rip-snorting tenor and bari monster with a wicked penchant for ferocious overblowing, he comes across as a shameless romantic on Chasin' the Gypsy, his lovely ode to Django. Still, Carter's characteristic bravado, tenor squeals, trills and remarkable displays of multiphonics are still intact here". On All About Jazz Mark Corroto noted, "Carter’s Reinhardt tribute, while appealing to traditional jazz fans, also has something to say to the Downtown crowd". Critic Robert Christgau rated the album an "A", saying, "this is the spirit marriage a tribute should be. It swings like a horse thief, parlays Fransay, and adores the melody".

Track listing

 "Nuages" (Django Reinhardt) - 5:36
 "La Dernière Bergère (The Last Shepherdess)" (Alec Siniavine, Bernard Sauvat) - 6:34
 "Manoir de Mes Reves (Django's Castle)" (Reinhardt) - 7:30
 "Artillerie Lourde (Heavy Artillery)" (Reinhardt) - 6:55
 "Chasin' the Gypsy" (James Carter) - 4:02
 "Oriental Shuffle" (Reinhardt, Stéphane Grappelli) - 8:04
 "I'll Never Be the Same" (Matty Malneckl, Frank Signorelli, Gus Kahn) - 7:17
 "Avalon" (Vincent Rose, Buddy DeSylva, Al Jolson) - 4:38
 "Imari's Lullaby" (James Carter) - 3:49

Personnel
James Carter - bass saxophone, tenor saxophone, mezzo-soprano saxophone, soprano saxophone
Regina Carter - violin
Jay Berliner - steel-string acoustic guitar
Romero Lubambo - classical guitar
Charles Giordano - accordion
Steve Kirby - bass
Cyro Baptista - percussion
Joey Baron - drums

References 

2000 albums
James Carter (musician) albums
Atlantic Records albums